Al Muteena (aka Muteena) is a locality in Dubai, United Arab Emirates (UAE). It is located in eastern Dubai, in the heart of Deira.

Locality
Al Muteena is bordered in the north by Al Baraha, in the south by Al Muraqqabat, in the west by Naif and in the east by Hor Al Anz.

The routes D 80 (Al Maktoum Road), D 88 (Omar bin Khattab Road), D 78 (Abu Baker Al Siddique Road) and D 82 (Al Rasheed Road) form a periphery around the locality. Al Muteena Street (14th Street) divides Al Muteena into roughly equal subcommunities. Al Muteena is largely residential; however, important hotels and restaurants are also located in the community.

Local streets in Al Muteena are numbered even, if they run east–west, or odd, if they run north–south. Odd-numbered streets run from 1st Street through 37th Street, while even-numbered streets run from 2nd A Street to 30th Street (near Renaissance Hotel).

Landmarks

Important landmarks in Al Muteena include Sheraton Deira, Renaissance Hotel, Marco Polo Hotel, the consulate of Bangladesh, and Al Muteena Park. Burj Al Nahar Roundabout and Fish Roundabout form the north- and southwesternmost sections of Al Muteena.

References

External links
 

Communities in Dubai